Diwana is a 1967 Indian Bollywood film directed by Mahesh Kaul. The film stars Raj Kapoor, Saira Banu and Lalita Pawar in pivotal roles. The film, made under the Anupam Chitra production banner had music by Shankar–Jaikishan, with lyrics by Hasrat Jaipuri and Shailendra.   Some songs are still popular like "Diwana Mujhko Log Kahein ", "Jisne Tumhe Chand Si Surat", "Hum To Jate Apne Gaon" and "Tumhari Bhi Jai Jai".  This film is also remembered for Kamal Kapoor's strong performance as Raj Kapoor's father.

Plot
Pyarelal (Raj Kapoor), a simple-minded and extremely naive young man, was orphaned at birth, and now lives with Fatima (Lalita Pawar), a Muslim landlady who treats him like her son. Once, he sets on a journey and meets a young woman with whom he falls in love, Kamini Gupta (Saira Banu). Sir Mayadas (Kamal Kapoor), the person who brought her up happens to be Pyarelal's real father. All of a sudden, Pyarelal is arrested on the charge of murder. No one believes that a harmless man like him could commit a crime, let alone kill. However, Pyarelal openly admits in court that he is indeed guilty, and demands capital punishment for it. The reason he does that is unveiled after several secrets, later on.

Cast
 Raj Kapoor... Pyarelal
 Saira Banu... Kamini Gupta
 Lalita Pawar... Fatima Begum
 Kamal Kapoor... Ramdas / Sir Mayadas
 Hiralal... Chopra 
 Leela Mishra... Kaki 
 Kanhaiyalal Chaturvedi... Kaka 
 Ravindra Kapoor... Inder Singh 
 Salim Khan... Diljit Singh 
 Jankidas... Chaddha 
 Ulhas... Gupta 
 Brahm Bhardwaj... Public Prosecutor 
 Bazid Khan... Advocate S. D. Mathur 
 Paul Sharma... Buta Singh 
 Nasreen... Diljit Singh's sidekick 
 Paul Mahendra

Soundtrack
The Music of the film is composed by the maestros Shankar–Jaikishan. All songs were popular even before the release of the film being played on Radios and Binaca Geetmala 1967. Songs were sung by Mukesh & Sharda.

Awards
Nominated, Filmfare Best Actress Award - Saira Banu
Nominated, Filmfare Best Music Director Award - Shankar Jaikishan
Nominated, Filmfare Best Female Playback Award - Sharda for "Tumhari Bhi Jai Jai"

References

External links

1967 films
1960s Hindi-language films
Films scored by Shankar–Jaikishan